In the mathematical field of topology a uniform isomorphism or  is a special isomorphism between uniform spaces that respects uniform properties. Uniform spaces with uniform maps form a category. An isomorphism between uniform spaces is called a uniform isomorphism.

Definition

  is a bijection
  is uniformly continuous
 the inverse function  is uniformly continuous

In other words, a uniform isomorphism is a uniformly continuous bijection between uniform spaces whose inverse is also uniformly continuous. 

Uniform embeddings

A  is an injective uniformly continuous map  between uniform spaces whose inverse  is also uniformly continuous, where the image  has the subspace uniformity inherited from

Examples

The uniform structures induced by equivalent norms on a vector space are uniformly isomorphic.

See also

  — an isomorphism between topological spaces
  — an isomorphism between metric spaces

References

 John L. Kelley, General topology, van Nostrand, 1955.  P.181.

Homeomorphisms
Uniform spaces